Jorge Alberto Sánchez López (born 14 February 1993) is a Mexican professional footballer who plays as a midfielder.

Necaxa

Sanchez won the Clausura 2016 with Necaxa after beating Zacatecas. Necaxa won the promotional playoff against F.C. Juárez in order to play in Liga MX starting the 2016-2017 Liga MX season.

Honours
Necaxa
Ascenso MX: Apertura 2014, Clausura 2016
Promotional Final

References

External links

1993 births
Living people
Mexican footballers
Association football midfielders
Club Celaya footballers
C.D. Veracruz footballers
Atlético San Luis footballers
Atlético Morelia players
Club Necaxa footballers
Liga MX players
Ascenso MX players
Liga Premier de México players
Tercera División de México players
Footballers from Guanajuato
People from Celaya